Col Bechei (2,794 m) is a mountain of the Dolomites  in South Tyrol, Italy. It lies in the Fanes group, northwest of Cortina d'Ampezzo. It is located in the Fanes-Sennes-Prags Nature Park in an area somewhat less frequented by tourists than other Domomite peaks.

References

Mountains of the Alps
Mountains of South Tyrol
Dolomites